Robert R. Parrish (January 4, 1916December 4, 1995) was an American film director, screenwriter, editor and former child actor. He received an Academy Award for Best Film Editing for his contribution to Body and Soul (1947).

Life and career
Born in Columbus, Georgia, Parrish was the son of Coca-Cola salesman Gordon R. Parrish  and actress Laura R. Parrish. The Parrish siblings, including Beverly and Helen, entered into acting in the 1920s when the family moved to Los Angeles.

Acting
Parrish made his debut film appearance in the Our Gang short Olympic Games (1927). He then appeared in the classic Sunrise: A Song of Two Humans (1927); Yale vs. Harvard (1928), another Our Gang short; Mother Machree (1928) and Four Sons (1928) from John Ford; Speedy (1928) with Harold Lloyd; Riley the Cop (1928) for Ford; The Iron Mask (1929) with Douglas Fairbanks; The Divine Lady (1929); The Racketeer (1929); Anna Christie (1930) with Greta Garbo; the anti-war film All Quiet on the Western Front (1930); The Big Trail (1930) with John Wayne; Up the River (1930) for Ford; The Right to Love (1930) with Ruth Chatterton; Charles Chaplin's City Lights (1931); Scandal Sheet (1931); I Take This Woman (1931); Forbidden (1932) for Frank Capra; The Miracle Man (1932); and Scandal for Sale (1932).

Parrish was in This Day and Age (1932) for Cecil B. de Mille; Doctor Bull (1933), Judge Priest (1934), The Whole Town's Talking (1935), and The Informer (1935) for Ford; The Crusades (1935) for de Mille; Steamboat Round the Bend (1935) and The Prisoner of Shark Island (1936) for Ford; Shipmates Forever (1936); One in a Million (1936) and Thin Ice (1937) with Sonia Henie; History Is Made at Night (1937) for Frank Borzage; It Could Happen to You! (1937); Thrill of a Lifetime (1938); Having Wonderful Time (1938); Mr. Doodle Kicks Off (1938); and Dramatic School (1938).

Editor
Ford encouraged Parrish to work behind the scenes and put him on as an editing apprentice on The Informer. He later hired Parrish as assistant editor for Mary of Scotland (1936). He worked on Ford films behind the scenes in editing and sound capacities, including Stagecoach (1939), Young Mr Lincoln (1939), Drums Along the Mohawk (1939), The Grapes of Wrath (1940), The Long Voyage Home (1940) and Tobacco Road (1941).

Both Ford and Parrish served in the United States Navy during World War II, and together they also produced a number of documentary and training films, including The Battle of Midway (1942), How to Operate Behind Enemy Lines (1943), German Industrial Manpower, and December 7th: The Movie (1943). Parrish also worked as editor on George Stevens' That Justice Be Done (1945), and The Nazi Plan (1945).

When Parrish got out of the army he helped edit Robert Rossen's boxing drama Body and Soul (1947). In 1947, Parrish shared the Academy Award, with co-nominee Francis Lyon, for his work on the film.

Parrish went on to edit A Double Life (1947) for George Cukor, No Minor Vices (1948) for Lewis Milestone, and Caught (1949) for Max Ophüls.

Parrish's second Academy Award nomination, shared with Al Clark, was for the political drama directed by Rossen, All the King's Men (1949). In the first versions done by Al Clark, the film was poorly received by preview audiences and studio executives. Parrish discovered that a "montage approach" was much more successful, with arbitrary cuts made a set time before and after each important action. In addition to the editing nomination for Clark and Parrish, the film won the Best Picture Award outright and was a popular success.

He also edited No Sad Songs for Me (1950) and A Woman of Distinction (1950), as well as the documentary Of Men and Music (1951).

Directing
Parrish made his directorial debut with the revenge drama Cry Danger (1951). Parrish followed it with The Mob (1951); and The San Francisco Story (1952), with Joel McCrea.

Parrish replaced Phil Karlson on Assignment: Paris (1952) and did some uncredited work on The Lusty Men (1952). He directed My Pal Gus (1952) and Rough Shoot (1953).

The Purple Plain (1954) was nominated for the Award for Best British Film at the 8th British Academy Film Awards.  Parrish followed it with Lucy Gallant (1955), Fire Down Below (1957), Saddle the Wind (1958), and The Wonderful Country (1959).

He did an episode of Johnny Staccato, "The Poet's Touch", and did several episodes of The Twilight Zone, "One for the Angels", "A Stop at Willoughby" and "The Mighty Casey".

Parrish returned to features with In the French Style (1963). He followed it with Up from the Beach (1965) and The Bobo (1967) with Peter Sellers. He directed some of Sellers' scenes in the James Bond parody Casino Royale (1967), he is credited among its five directors.

Parrish also directed Duffy (1968), Doppelgänger (1969), A Town Called Bastard (1971) and The Marseille Contract (1974).

His final film, co-directed by Bertrand Tavernier, was Mississippi Blues (1983).

He had an acting role in the film, Blue Bayou (1990).

Memoirs
Summing up Parrish's career, Allen Grant Richards commented that "Other than his excellent editing work and early directing, Parrish may be most remembered as storyteller from his two books of Hollywood memoirs." Filmmaker Kevin Brownlow wrote of Parrish's first memoir, Growing Up In Hollywood (1976), "His stories about these pictures were marvellous in themselves, and he often came at them sideways, so not only the punchline but the situation took you by surprise. We all entreated him to write them down and in 1976 he did so, producing one of the most enchanting – and hilarious – books about the picture business ever written [...] [Growing Up In Hollywood] ought to be reprinted in this centenary [birth] year." The sequel, Hollywood Doesn't Live Here Anymore (1988), followed.

Selected filmography

Director

 The Mob (1951)
 Cry Danger (1951)
 Remember That Face (1951) 
 Assignment – Paris! (1952)
 My Pal Gus (1952)
 Rough Shoot (1953)
 The Purple Plain (1954)
 Lucy Gallant (1955)
 Fire Down Below (1957)
 Saddle the Wind (1958)
 The Wonderful Country (1959)
 In the French Style (1963)
 Up from the Beach (1965)
 Casino Royale (1967)
 The Bobo (1967)
 Duffy (1968)
 Doppelgänger (1969)
 A Town Called Bastard (1971)
 The Marseille Contract (1974)

Editor

The Battle of Midway (1942)
How to Operate Behind Enemy Lines (1943)
German Industrial Manpower (1943)
December 7th (film) (1943)
That Justice Be Done (1945)
The Nazi Plan (1945)
A Double Life (1947)
Body and Soul (1947; with Francis D. Lyon)
No Minor Vices (1948)
All the King's Men (1949; with Al Clark)
Caught (1949)
No Sad Songs for Me (1950; with W. Lyon)
Of Men and Music (1951)

Autobiographies

References

Further reading

External links

1916 births
1995 deaths
20th-century American male actors
20th-century American businesspeople
Male actors from Georgia (U.S. state)
Male actors from Los Angeles
American male child actors
American male film actors
American male non-fiction writers
20th-century American memoirists
United States Navy personnel of World War II
American male screenwriters
Best Film Editing Academy Award winners
Businesspeople from Georgia (U.S. state)
Businesspeople from Los Angeles
American documentary film directors
Film producers from California
Actors from Columbus, Georgia
Writers from Columbus, Georgia
Writers from Los Angeles
Film directors from Los Angeles
Film directors from Georgia (U.S. state)
Screenwriters from California
American film editors
20th-century American male writers
20th-century American screenwriters